Civil Eats  is an independent, nonprofit digital news and commentary site about the American food system.  Founded in 2009 by Naomi Starkman and Paul Crossfield, who left the organization in 2014, as of 2021 the editorial team now includes Twilight Greenaway, Matthew Wheeland, Christina Cooke, Tilde Herrera and Bridget Shirvell. The site works with more than 100 freelance reporters nationwide. Among other topics, it reports on food policy, environmental issues, food-related health, and farming issues.

For its first four years, Civil Eats operated with no funding. It raised an unprecedented $100,000 via Kickstarter in 2013, was named Publication of the Year in 2014 by the James Beard Foundation, inducted into the Library of Congress in 2019, and won the IACP Digital Media Award for Best Group Food Blog in 2020. Editor-in-chief Naomi Starkman was a 2016 John S. Knight Fellow at Stanford University.

References

External links
 

Culinary arts